Deh-e Esmail (also Romanized as Deh-e Esmā‘īl) is a village in Chahdegal Rural District, Negin Kavir District, Fahraj County, Kerman Province, Iran. At the 2006 census, its population was 187, in 39 families.

References 

Populated places in Fahraj County